Jessica Muscat (born 27 February 1989 in Mosta, Malta), more commonly known as Jessika is a Maltese singer and actress. She represented San Marino in the Eurovision Song Contest 2018 in Lisbon, Portugal, with the song "Who We Are", alongside Jenifer Brening. She had previously attempted to represent her home country every year from 2008 to 2016 and in the Junior Eurovision Song Contest 2004 with the song "Precious Time". As an actress, she plays the character of Emma on daily Maltese soap opera Ħbieb u Għedewwa.

Eurovision attempts

Junior Eurovision Song Contest
Maltese national selection

Eurovision Song Contest
Maltese national selection

Sammarinese national selection

Discography

Singles

Notes

References

1989 births
Living people
Eurovision Song Contest entrants of 2018
21st-century Maltese women singers
21st-century Maltese singers
People from Mosta
Eurovision Song Contest entrants for San Marino